Nina Lauren Bassuk (born February 16, 1952) is a professor and program leader of the Urban Horticulture Institute at Cornell University.

Education  
Bassuk received her B.S. in Horticulture from Cornell University in 1974 and her Ph.D. in Horticulture from the University of London in 1980.

Research and career  
Bassuk has worked in the Horticulture Department of Cornell University since 1980. In 1993, she became the program leader at the Urban Horticulture Institute. Her teaching, research and extension efforts aspire to enhance the function and health of plants growing in urban and disturbed areas.

Through her work researching the physiological problems of plants growing in urban environments, she has developed several technologies to improve establishment and health of plants, including development of ‘CU-Structural Soil,’ for which she holds a patent with her colleague Jason Grabosky.  She has authored over 100 papers focusing on the physiological problems of plants growing in urban environments.

Nina serves on the technical advisory committee of the Sustainable Sites Initiative and is on the board of New York State Urban Forestry Council.

Books 
 Coauthor, Trees in the Urban Landscape with Peter Trowbridge

Awards  
 2015 Alex L. Shigo Award for Excellence in Arboricultural Education, International Society of Arboriculture
 2015 Senior Scholars Award, New York State Arborists Association
 2015 Olmsted Award, National Arbor Day Foundation
 2015 Stephen H.Weiss Presidential Fellowship, Cornell University
 2015 American Horticultural Society Teaching Award
 2014-2015 CALS Featured Faculty
 2014 New York State Urban Forestry Council 10 years award
 2012 Sustainable Sites Initiative certification of Cornell University's Mann Library Landscape.
 2010 Merrill Presidential Advisor nomination
 2008 Scott Foundation Award and Medal
 2007 Society of Municipal Arborists presidential appreciation award
 2007 Founders Award for New York Urban and Community Forestry Council
 2007 CALS Teaching Award of Merit from the National Association of College Teachers of Agriculture.
 2007 Ithaca Neighborhood Housing Services Florence Hoard Landscape Beautification Award
 2005- David Allee Campus/County Connection Award from Association of Natural Resources Professionals/NY
 2004- New York State Nursery and Landscape Association Gold Medal of Horticulture Award
 2004 One of 3 finalist teams for the World Trade Center Memorial competition, NYC
 2003 David Allee Campus-Connection award from Assn. of Natural Resource Extension Professionals/NY
 2002- Society of Municipal Arborists Award of Merit
 2002 – Award for contributions to Urban Forestry, NY State Council on Urban and Community Forestry
 2001 – Elected Fellow, International Plant Propagators Society
 2000 – Norman Jay Colman Award for noteworthy nursery research contributions from the American Nursery and Landscape Association
 1999 – Outstanding New Publication Award: NYS Agricultural Agents
 1999 – Outstanding Research in Arboriculture: International Soc. Arboriculture

References

External links 
 https://hort.cals.cornell.edu/people/nina-bassuk
 http://www.hort.cornell.edu/uhi/

Cornell University College of Agriculture and Life Sciences alumni
Cornell University faculty
American landscape architects
Women landscape architects
American horticulturists
Living people
1952 births